Uncle Croc's Block is an hour-long live-action/animated television series. It was produced by Filmation, and broadcast on ABC in 1975–76.

The show was a spoof of live kids' shows but with (as MeTV would later describe it) a "bitter edge". Charles Nelson Reilly played the eponymous Uncle Croc, a crocodile that hated his job as the show's host and made only the barest of efforts to hide his contempt. Also featured were Alfie Wise as his rabbit sidekick, Mr. Rabbit Ears, and Jonathan Harris as Basil Bitterbottom, the show-within-a-show's frustrated director. A motorcycle-riding bird named Koo Koo Knievel (a parody of stuntman Evel Knievel) popped out of a clock to announce when it was "Star Time", and a celebrity "guest" would appear.

The series premiered at 10:30 am ET on September 6, 1975. Uncle Croc's Block was up against the second half of the popular The Shazam!/Isis Hour (another Filmation property) and Far Out Space Nuts on CBS and Run, Joe, Run and Return to the Planet of the Apes on NBC. The show, which was fitted with an adult laugh track, was shortened to 30 minutes, then scrapped on February 14, 1976, after half a season on the air.

As a result of the show's poor performance, ABC president Fred Silverman severed all ties with Filmation and began commissioning its Saturday morning cartoons from Hanna-Barbera, with which he had a working relationship during his time at CBS. Filmation noted that the cancellation—though Filmation had had several series end after short runs, none had ever been cancelled before completing their runs up to that point—actually saved the studio money because ABC had already paid for a full season and now Filmation did not have to follow through on paying to produce the remaining episodes. In an attempt to save ratings, Filmation had planned to repackage the repeated Groovie Goolies episodes as a new segment, redubbed the Super Fiends (capitalizing on the title of rival Hanna-Barbera's Super Friends), but the show was shelved before the change could be incorporated. The animated segments were featured in the Filmation syndicated package, The Groovie Goolies and Friends, and also resurfaced in the home video market in the 1980s.

Star Time
Each episode contained a "Star Time" segment in which parodies of popular characters appeared, usually making denigrating remarks about the show and/or its staff, and demonstrating their abilities (or lack thereof). Guests included:

 Captain Klangeroo is a parody of Captain Kangaroo.
 Mr. Mean Jeans (played by Huntz Hall) is a parody of Mr. Greenjeans.
 Sherlock Domes (played by Carl Ballantine) is a parody of Sherlock Holmes.
 Dr. Watkins (played by Stanley Adams) is the sidekick of Sherlock Domes. He is a parody of Dr. Watson.
 Witchie Goo Goo (played by Phyllis Diller) is a witch whose prince-conjuring spell always summons a never-willing Basil to her. She is a parody of Witchiepoo from H.R. Pufnstuf.
 Junie the Genie (played by Alice Ghostley) is an allegedly teenaged genie. She is a parody of Jeannie from I Dream of Jeannie with a bit of Sabrina the Teenage Witch.
 Billy Bratson (played by Marvin Kaplan as Captain Marbles) says "Shazowie" to turn into the superhero Captain Marbles, in the same way Billy Batson transformed into Captain Marvel by saying "Shazam!".
 Steve Exhaustion, The $6.95 Man (played by Robert Ridgely) is a cyborg that always falls apart. He is a parody of Steve Austin, The Six Million Dollar Man.
 Old Fogey Bear is a manic-depressive bear. He is a parody of Yogi Bear.
 Miss Invis is a woman who falsely claims to be able to make herself invisible.

Cartoon segments
The show also included the cartoon shorts:

 M*U*S*H (short for Mangy Unwanted Shabby Heroes): Sled dogs (voiced by Kenneth Mars and Robert Ridgely) work at a medical outpost in the frozen wasteland of Upper Saboonia. This cartoon is a lampoon of M*A*S*H. In his 2012 autobiography, Lou Scheimer stated that he had written the segment to be intentionally unfunny, a concept that Scheimer found to be a better concept than ABC did: "you were supposed to laugh at it, not with it."
 Fraidy Cat: Fraidy Cat (voiced by Alan Oppenheimer) is cursed with the ability to involuntarily summon his eight past lives, personified as their respective time periods (seven of each voiced by Lennie Weinrib. Life #6 is voiced by Lou Scheimer).
 Wacky and Packy: A prehistoric caveman named Wacky, and his pet woolly mammoth Packy (both voiced by Allan Melvin) get trapped in a cave, and they end up getting transported two million years into the future, into modern times.

References

External links
 Uncle Croc's Block at Internet Movie Database
 M*U*S*H at Internet Movie Database
 Fraidy Cat at Internet Movie Database
 Wacky and Packy Internet Movie Database
 

American Broadcasting Company original programming
1970s American children's comedy television series
1975 American television series debuts
1976 American television series endings
American television series with live action and animation
American television shows featuring puppetry
Television series by Filmation
Television series by Universal Television
Television series about television